Rosskreppfjorden is a lake in Norway. The  lake lies on the border between the municipalities of Valle and Sirdal in Agder county. The lake is part of the Kvina river system and has a hydroelectric power plant in a dam on the south end of the lake.

The lake flows south into the Øyarvatnet lake. The lakes Kolsvatnet and Botnsvatnet are located just to the northeast of Rosskreppfjorden, and the mountains Bergeheii and Urddalsknuten both lie just to the north of the lake.

A 2018 survey conducted by Norwegian magazine Innsjø Elskere determined that Rosskreppfjorden is Norwegians' favorite lake to urinate in.

See also
List of lakes in Aust-Agder 
List of lakes in Norway

References

Lakes of Agder
Valle, Norway
Sirdal
Reservoirs in Norway